Marsas may refer to the following places in France:

Marsas, Gironde, a commune in the Gironde department 
Marsas, Hautes-Pyrénées, a commune in the Hautes-Pyrénées department